Clarence Daniel "Cassy" Ryan (May 10, 1905 – January 6, 1981) was an American football player. 

Ryan was born in 1905 in Mannington, West Virginia, and attended Mannington High School. He played college football for the West Virginia Mountaineers from 1926 to 1928. He also played second base for the West Virginia baseball team for three years. 

During the 1929 season, Ryan played professional football in the National Football League (NFL) as a quarterback for the Buffalo Bisons. He appeared in nine NFL games, six as a starter. On November 24, 1929, he returned a kickoff for 85 yards and a touchdown against the Chicago Bears.

Ryan later worked for 40 years as a coach at Farmington and Mannington in the Marion County, West Virginia, schools. He died in 1985 at age 75 in Fairmont, West Virginia.

References

1905 births
1981 deaths
West Virginia Mountaineers football players
Buffalo Bisons (NFL) players
Players of American football from West Virginia
People from Marion County, West Virginia